Elizarov Mikhail Yuryevich (January 28, 1973) – is a modern Russian writer and singer-songwriter, laureate of the Russian Booker Prize in 2008 for the novel The Librarian.

Literary career

In 2001, the Russian publishing house Ad Marginem issued a collection of short novels Fingernails, which immediately captured the attention of the media and critics. The collection includes 24 short stories and a novel of the same title, the main characters of which are two pupils who possess paranormal abilities studying in a boarding school for demented children. The story was shortlisted for the Andrei Bely literary prize. Russian literary critic Lev Danilkin of the Afisha magazine hailed the collection as the best debut of the year.

The next Elizarov's novel Pasternak (2003) prompted controversial polemic among Russian critics. In this anti-liberal and anti-sectarian lampoon, the poet Boris Pasternak is depicted in the form of a demon who "poisons" the intelligentsia's minds with his works. Some critics categorized the book as "trash", "a sickening novel". Literary critic Alla Latynina wrote in Novy Mir, that the novel has "an unpretentious, rather pop culture plot". The Continent magazine, in a review of literary criticism, wrote that "when brown comes into fashion, its fans appear in literary circles", calling the author of NG-Ex libris Lev Pirogov, who spoke favourably of the novel, "a Nazi-minded ideologist". Moreover, the magazine noted that the leitmotif of the criticism was "the crisis of liberal values, the entry into the arena of the enemies of freedom".

On the other hand, the critic Vladimir Bondarenko in Zavtra newspaper praised highly the novel: "This is where the unbridled Russian revenge showed itself in full splendor, as a response to all the humiliations and insults of the Russian nation, the Russian character, the Russian faith and the Russian dream ... Through all a set of avant-garde literary techniques, through the philology of the text and dense erudition of the young writer, not inferior to either Umberto Eco, or Milorad Pavić, the unshakable centuries-old spiritual values of the Russian people are vehemently defended". Lev Danilkin labeled the novel as an "Orthodox philosophical action movie".

In 2007, Elizarov's novel The Librarian was published, which in December 2008 won him the Russian Booker Prize. The protagonist of the novel learns that some books of a forgotten Soviet writer possess mystical properties, and various groups of readers are waging a fierce battle to get them. As was noted by Anna Kuznetsova in the Znamya magazine, "Mikhail Elizarov's prose seems to be evolving like Vladimir Sorokin's: from scandalous shockingness to fiction rich in intellectual content". In 2015 the novel was translated to English by Andrew Bromfield and issued in Pushkin Press, London. Jeff VanderMeer highly praised the novel as "immensely entertaining" and compared it to works of Nikolai Gogol and Mikhail Bulgakov, "while being very much its own thing"

In 2011, the novel Cartoons became the finalist of the award National Bestseller.
 
In 2014, Elizarov won the NOS Prize in the nomination "Audience Choice Award" with the collection of short stories named We went out to smoke for 17 years. Mikhail Elizarov says, that "if we assume that the writer has two ink tanks on his desk with different kind of inks, then this book, unlike all my previous ones, is written entirely with the contents of the second ink tank. It has never happened to me before. A distinctive feature of this "second ink" is fiction. There is not a word of truth in this book". Nevertheless, the short stories in this collection are written in rather autobiographical, true-to-life style, uncharacteristic of all his previous books.

After almost six years of "silence", Mikhail Elizarov published a new book in October 2019. Titled Ground, the new novel is the first large-scale reflection on the "Russian Thanatos". As the Russian writer and critic Andrey Astvatsaturov notes in his review, "Elizarov seems to have written his best novel so far. Inspirational and at the same time masterful, mature, measured and carefully thought out from the first to the last paragraph. Despite the huge array of text, this book is only the first part of the novel Ground, titled The Digger". The plot unfolds itself around the protagonist who works in the funeral business in modern Russia and meets a mysterious young lady covered in tattoos.

Russian literary critic Viktor Toporov characterizes Elizarov as one of only two or three contemporary visionary writers of Russian literature (along with Vladimir Sharov and Sasha Sokolov)

Musical career
In parallel to his literary activities, Mikhail Elizarov also performs songs of his own composition. As of 2020, Elizarov's discography consists of eleven albums.

Literary works
 Prose / Проза (novel, short stories) / Kharkov: "Torsing", 2000, 
 Fingernails / Ногти (novel, short stories) / Moscow: Ad Marginem, 2001, 
 Pasternak (novel) / Moscow: Ad Marginem, 2003, 
 Red film / Красная плёнка (short stories) / Moscow: Ad Marginem, 2005, 
 The Librarian / Библиотекарь (novel) / Moscow: Ad Marginem, 2007, 
 Blocks / Кубики (short stories) / Moscow: Ad Marginem, 2008, 
 Cartoons / Мультики (novel) / Moscow: AST, 2010, 
 Burattini, The Fascism has passed / Бураттини. Фашизм прошёл (essays) / Moscow: AST, 2011, 978-5-271-36619-2
 We went out to smoke for 17 years... / Мы вышли покурить на 17 лет… (short stories) / Moscow: Astel, 2012, 
 Ground / Земля (novel) / Moscow: AST, 2019,

Awards 
Russian Booker Prize (2008) for the novel The Librarian.
Short-list of the Andrei Bely Prize (2001), Fingernails.
Finalist of the National Bestseller award (2011), Cartoons.
"Audience Choice Award" NOS Prize (2014), for the collection of short-stories We went out to smoke for 17 years.
Short-list of the National Bestseller award (2020), Ground.

Translations 
 Mikhail Elizarov The Librarian / translated to English by Andrew Bromfield // Published by Pushkin Press, London, February 10, 2015 | 416 Pages | 
 Michail Jelizarow "Die Nägel" / translated to German by Hannelore Umbreit // Leipzig: "Reclam", 2003, 128 Seiten, 
 Mikhail Elizarov "Le Bibliothécaire" / translated to French by Françoise Mancip-Renaudie // Paris: "Calmann-Lévy", 2010, 384 p., 
 Mikhail Jelizarov "Neglene" / translated to Danish by Jon Kyst // København: "Forlaget Vandkunsten", 2010, 120 sider, 
 Michail Elizarov "Il bibliotecario" / translated to Italian by S. Guagnelli // Roma: "Atmosphere libri", 2011, 436 p., 
 Mihail Jelizarov "Knjiga mudrosti" / translated to Serbian by Vesna Kecman // Beograd : "Alnari", 2012, 320, [1] с. 
 Michail Elizarov "Cartoni" / translated to Italian by Giulia Marcucci // Roma: Atmosphere libri, 2012, 238, (Biblioteca del fuoco) .
 Mihhail Jelizarov "Raamatuhoidja" (The Librarian) / translated to Estonian by Veronika Einberg // Tallinn: Varrak, 2012, 359 .

Discography 
 2010 — Notebook / Notebook
 2011 — It makes me mad / Зла не хватает
 2011 — About the goat / Про козла
 2012 — I'll post / Запощу
 2012 — We went out to smoke for 17 years / Мы вышли покурить на 17 лет
 2013 — The house and paints / Дом и краски
 2014 — Book of complaints / Жалобная книга
 2015 — Ragnarök / Рагнарёк
 2017 — In bright phuck / В светлом ахуе
 2018 — Soldier's grunge / Солдатский гранж
 2020 — Sectarian album / Сектантский альбом

References

External links 
 Official site of Mikhail Elizarov
 Pushkin Press
  Community of readers of Mikhail Elizarov
 Russian Literature Online
 Mikhail Yelizarov. Summer Concert
 7 Russian Booker Prize winners and their must-read novels

Bibliography 
 Evgeny Dobrenko, Mark Lipovetsky. (2015). Russian Literature since 1991. Cambridge University Press.  / 
 Elen Rutten. (2017). Sincerity after communism. Yale University Press, New Haven and London. 
 Andrew Kahn, Mark Lipovetsky, Irina Reyfman, Stephanie Sandler. (2018). A History of Russian Literature. Oxford University Press.

Reviews 
 James Lovegrove 'The Librarian', by Mikhail Elizarov / Financial Times, May 1, 2015
 Matt Dorfman The Best Book Covers of 2015 / The New York Times, December 11, 2015
 Jane Graham, The power of words. The Librarian / The boy who stole Attila's horse / The Big Issue, p. 31, March 23–29, 2015
 Karen Langley The Librarian by Mikhail Elizarov / Shiny New Books
 Isabel Lower In Review: "The Librarian" by Mikhail Elizarov / Asymptote Journal, April 28, 2015
 Elena Dimov (translation of the excerpt) The Librarian by Mikhail Elizarov / Contemporary Russian Literature, University of Virginia, November 28, 2019 
 Oksana Sizykh The model of the Moscow world in M. Elizarovs story Masha/ / Revista de Humanidades / No. 30. January–April 2017
 Zoran Rosko Mikhail Elizarov, The Librarian / zorosko.blogspot.com, September 27, 2013
 Luke Goldstein Book Review: 'The Librarian' by Mikhail Elizarov / Gobs of reviews, January 8, 2015
 Tom Ruffles The Librarian, by Mikhail Elizarov / The Joy of Mere Words, Book notes by Tom Ruffles, PhD, August 17, 2017
 Ted Hodgkinson Pulp Fiction, The Librarian By Mikhail Elizarov / Literary Review, May 2015
 David Gillespie Book review: Mikhail Elizarov, 'The Librarian', Open Democracy, May 19, 2015
 Eliot Borenstein The Orc-Song of Mikhail Y. Elizarov / Russia's alien nations, September 17, 2019
 Phoebe Taplin 'The Librarian': Philosophical parable or fascist nostalgia? / Russia Beyond, April 22, 2015
 Tobias Carrol Five Visions of Post-Soviet Weirdness / tor.com, June 15, 2016

Interviews 
 Михаил Елизаров: "Диалог с властью — это письма кишечнику…" // "ШО", №?, September 24, 2012
 Михаил Елизаров: "Россия — словоцентричная страна" // ThankYou.ru, August 21, 2012
  Михаил Елизаров: "С башни снесло" // Rossiyskaya Gazeta, June 17, 2009

Notes 

Living people
Russian male writers
21st-century Russian writers
Russian male short story writers
Russian writers of Ukrainian descent
Russian Booker Prize winners
Russian singer-songwriters
1973 births
National University of Kharkiv alumni
Russian writers
Russian male novelists
21st-century Russian novelists
21st-century Russian short story writers
Russian bards
Russian male singer-songwriters